Rimantas Šidlauskas (14 June 1962 – 12 September 2022) was a Lithuanian diplomat who was the Ambassador Extraordinary and Plenipotentiary of the Republic of Lithuania to the Russian Federation.

References 

1962 births
2022 deaths
Ambassadors of Lithuania to Russia
Lithuanian diplomats
People from Kėdainiai District Municipality